Chriss is a surname. Notable people with the surname include:

Alcée Chriss III, American organist, composer, and conductor
Marquese Chriss (born 1997), American basketball player 
Neil Chriss (born 1967), American mathematician and investor

English-language surnames